Dolph Briscoe Jr. (April 23, 1923 – June 27, 2010) was an American rancher and businessman from Uvalde, Texas, who was the 41st governor of Texas between 1973 and 1979. He was a member of the Democratic Party.

Because of his re-election following an amendment to the Texas Constitution doubling the Governor's term to four years, Briscoe became both the last governor to serve a two-year term and the first to serve a four-year term.

A lifelong resident of Uvalde, Briscoe was first elected to the Texas Legislature in 1948 and served as a state representative from 1949 to 1957. As part of the reform movement in state politics stemming from the Sharpstown scandal, Briscoe won election as governor in 1972. During his six years as governor, Briscoe presided during a period of reform in state government as Texas's population and commerce boomed.

Following his two terms as governor, Briscoe returned to the ranching and banking business in Uvalde. He is recognized as having been one of the leading citizens of the state and a benevolent supporter of many civic, cultural, and educational institutions in Texas and the nation. Most recently before his death the former Texas governor established the Dolph and Janey Briscoe Fund for Texas History at the University of Texas at Austin.

He was the last Democratic Texan to be re-elected to the Governor's Mansion with his reelection landslide victory in 1974; fellow Democratic governors Mark White and Ann Richards lost their re-election bids respectively, in 1986 and 1994.

Early years
Dolph Briscoe Jr., was born on April 23, 1923, the only child of Dolph Sr. and Georgie Briscoe in Uvalde, Texas. His father was a descendant of Texas Declaration of Independence signer Andrew Briscoe. Briscoe was first attracted to politics at an early age. Thanks to his father's friendship with Governor Ross Sterling, the young Briscoe traveled to Austin and the Texas Governor's Mansion in 1932. At the age of nine, Governor Sterling invited Briscoe to stay at the mansion and sleep in Sam Houston's bed.

After graduation from Uvalde High School as valedictorian, Briscoe attended the University of Texas at Austin. He was active in many campus organizations, including the Friar Society, the Texas Cowboys, Chi Phi Fraternity, and was editor of The Cactus yearbook. While at the university, he met fellow student Betty Jane "Janey" Slaughter (1923 – 2000) of Austin. They married in 1942 and had three children.

After graduation from the University of Texas in 1943 with a Bachelor of Arts degree, Briscoe enlisted as a private in the United States Army. He served in the China Burma India Theater during World War II and advanced in rank to become an officer.

Political career
When Briscoe returned from military service, he returned home to Uvalde and the ranching business. He soon rekindled his interest in politics. Briscoe counted Vice President John Nance Garner, President Lyndon Baines Johnson, House Speaker Sam Rayburn, and Governor Sterling as his political mentors.

Briscoe's first step into elective politics began with a race for state representative in the Texas House of Representatives in 1948. He won his first election and was re-elected in 1950, 1952 and 1954 and served from 1949 to 1957. He became best known as the co-author of the Colson-Briscoe Act, which appropriated funding for the state's farm-to-market road system.

He also held key chairmanships for the agriculture and highway committees. When his father died in 1954, Briscoe returned home to head the family ranching business instead of running for a fifth term.

Ranching and banking business

Upon his father's death in 1954, Dolph Briscoe Jr. became the owner and manager of one of the largest and most diverse ranches in Texas. By 1972, he was the state's largest individual landowner. As the youngest person to become president of the Texas and Southwestern Cattle Raisers Association in 1960, Briscoe and the organization raised $3 million in voluntary contributions to the federal and state governments to launch a screwworm eradication program in Texas and the Southwest.

1968 campaign for Governor

In 1968, Briscoe attempted to reenter the political arena, when he joined a list of candidates seeking to replace retiring Texas Gov. John Connally, who chose not to seek a fourth term. Briscoe finished fourth in the Democratic gubernatorial primary that year.

There was a runoff between the more liberal contender, Don Yarborough of Houston (no relation to U.S. Senator Ralph Yarborough), and Lieutenant Governor Preston Smith of Lubbock. Smith won the runoff and then defeated Republican Paul Eggers by a margin of 57 percent to 43 percent in the November general election and was subsequently re-elected defeating Eggers in their 1970 rematch, 53 percent to 46 percent.

1972 campaign for Governor

Four years later, when the Sharpstown scandal rocked state government, Briscoe ran as a reform candidate and defeated incumbent Gov. Preston Smith, who was  seeking a third two-year term and Lieutenant Governor Ben Barnes in the Democratic primary.  Briscoe bested another reform candidate in liberal activist Sissy Farenthold for the Democratic gubernatorial nomination in a heated runoff primary. He ran on a platform of honesty and integrity in government and opposed any new state taxes.

After his victory in the Democratic primary, Briscoe narrowly defeated the Republican candidate, State Senator Henry Grover of Houston, in the November 1972 general election. The final tally was 1,633,493 (47.9 percent) for Briscoe and 1,533,986 (45 percent) for Grover. The Raza Unida Party candidate, 29-year-old Ramsey Muñiz, received 214,118 votes (6 percent), nearly all believed to have been at Briscoe's expense.

Governorship

Briscoe was inaugurated as the forty-first governor of Texas on January 16, 1973.

During his two terms as governor, Briscoe balanced increasing demands for more state services and a rapidly growing population. As the governor elected during a period of social unrest and skepticism about the motives of elected officials, he helped restore integrity to a state government fallen into disgrace as a result of the Sharpstown scandals. Briscoe's terms as governor led to a landmark events and achievements, including the most extensive ethics and financial disclosure bill in state history, passage of the Open Meetings and Open Records legislation, and strengthened laws regulating lobbyists. Briscoe also presided over the first revision of the state's penal code in one hundred years.

Briscoe added $4 billion in new state funds for public education and higher education, increased teacher salaries by the highest percentage in history,  and raised salaries for state employees as well. He expanded services to handicapped Texans by the Texas Department of Mental Health and Mental Retardation, and established the first toll-free hotline for runaway children. He appointed a larger number of women and minorities to positions in Texas state government than any previous governor, appointed the first African American members to state boards, and named the first African American district judge. No new state taxes were passed during Briscoe's terms as governor, making him the first governor since World War II to hold the line on both new state taxes or increasing existing ones.

As governor, he focused on the maintenance and efficiency of existing government agencies as opposed to the creation of new ones.  As a veteran rancher, Briscoe also worked to help the farmers and ranchers of the state during his tenure. This included the eradication of the screw worm on both sides of the Rio Grande.

Dolph Briscoe also advocated a reduction of the state speed limit to 55 mph in the aftermath of the 1973 Arab Oil Embargo. The Texas Highway Commission voted 3-0 in favor of his recommendation on December 4, 1973. The measure was overturned in the Texas Supreme Court two days later. Briscoe, along with the Texas legislature adopted the 55 mph speed limit passed by congress in January 1974.

In the 1974 general electionthe first for a four-year term in Texas since 1873Briscoe defeated the Republican nominee, former Lubbock Mayor Jim Granberry, by a wide margin and carried 249 out of 254 counties. Briscoe garnered 1,016,334 votes (61 percent) to Granberry's 514,725 votes (31 percent) in a heavily Democratic year. Granberry earlier had defeated Odell McBrayer, a "New Right" candidate, in the Republican primary. In the Briscoe-Granberry race, Ramsey Muñiz ran again for governor and polled 93,295 votes  on the La Raza party. Another approximately 30,000 ballots were cast for assorted minor candidates. Briscoe's second term began on January 21, 1975, making him the first Texas governor to serve a full four-year term during his six years in office. Republican Edmund J. Davis had served a four-year term from 1869 to 1873, but there were no two-year terms at the time of his tenure under the Texas Constitution of 1869.

In 1974 and 1975, Briscoe undercut two attempts to write a new constitution for the state of Texas. He said that the proposals before the legislature, acting as a constitutional convention in 1974, and later, in 1975, before the voters, would cause expansion of government and weaken the executive branch, already considered too weak by most political scientists. In addition to his accomplishments as governor, Briscoe served as chairman of the Southern Governors Association, presided over the Interstate Oil Compact Commission, served on the National Petroleum Council, and was on the executive committee of the National Governor's Association.

Briscoe appointed Charles Schreiner, III, a Kerr County rancher-businessman and a grandson of legendary cattle baron Charles Schreiner, to the board of the Lower Colorado River Authority.

1978 campaign for Governor

Briscoe announced his intentions to seek a third term in the upcoming 1978 gubernatorial elections in a bid to become the state's first governor to serve 10 years in office. While he attracted a loyal group of admirers, he also made enemies inside the Texas Democratic Party, the majority of whom had remained unimpressed with his leadership over his six years in office. Briscoe had not won his first term by a wide margin. In the wake of a nationwide Republican sweep in 1972, Briscoe barely won election over a well-organized Republican opponent. Some results on election night alarmed the party faithful with results showing Briscoe trailing Grover, results that caused many to question Briscoe's effectiveness. Despite Briscoe's clear victory, critics continued to deride him as a "minority governor."

By 1977, Briscoe had come under fire by many Texans for this same understated style that won him many admirers. Much of the criticism had mounted for years. State Rep. Walt Parker of Denton echoed the sentiments of many in a 1973 interview about the lack of enthusiasm on Briscoe's performance. Many became disappointed with the lack of progress on many pressing issues. Liberal Democrats, teachers, ranchers, and Hispanics had all become increasingly agitated with the Briscoe administration. When a scandal broke out over the management of the Office of Migrant Affairs, an organization run by the governor's office through federal funds, many believed Briscoe's days as governor were numbered as a rebellion simmered within the Democratic ranks.

Things went from bad to politically damaging for Briscoe, as the appointments proved to be embarrassing for his administration. By 1978, Briscoe had named nearly every appointed person in state government. Relying heavily on an appointments secretary on securing the names of upstanding Texans to serve in these positions, Briscoe didn't notice a horrifying mistake the secretary made. Briscoe had appointed a dead man to the State Health Advisory Commission. His staunch critics howled at the embarrassing episode and the popular magazine, Texas Monthly awarded him the "Bum Steer Award" for the comic aspects of this appointment.

During his successful 1974 reelection campaign, Briscoe fought both aggressively and bitterly back against the Raza Unida Party to try to destroy the organization and prevent the movement from spreading beyond South Texas. He had countered RUP with legislative attempts to tighten requirements for political party recognition. Moreover, he denounced the party as a communist threat and blocked federal funds for Zavala County programs. The fallout from the fight over federal funds for RUP's Zavala County stronghold would affect the 1978 primary fight.

As a result of the political backlash against his policies over racial, educational and economic issues, Briscoe was defeated in the Democratic primary on May 6, 1978 by then-Texas Attorney General John Hill, who garnered 932,245 votes and (52.4 percent) to Briscoe's 753,309 votes and (42.4 percent) with former Governor Preston Smith receiving 92,202 votes and (5.2 percent). In the November general election, Hill was very narrowly defeated for the Texas governorship by Republican Bill Clements, who polled 1,183,828 votes (49.96 percent) to Hill's 1,166,919 votes (49.24 percent). Some say the bitterness of the nasty Democratic gubernatorial primary between Briscoe and Hill led to Texas Democrats losing their control of the Governor's Mansion after 105 years of Democratic dominance.

Briscoe left the Texas Governor's Mansion on January 16, 1979 after six years in office and returned to the ranching and banking business in his hometown of Uvalde.

Briscoe won many political and civic awards over the years, including the designation of "Mr. South Texas" in Laredo. He was the largest individual landowner in Texas.

Philanthropy

The former governor was also active in the philanthropic community, having given several million dollars to various Texas institutions, mostly centered in and around the San Antonio area.   In 2006, he gave a sizeable gift to the Witte Museum, a local gallery which features exhibits specifically geared towards Children.  In 2008 he donated $5 million to the University of Texas Health Science Center at San Antonio in support of cardiology research and women's health.  This gift was made in honor of his late wife, Janey. Also, that year, he donated $15 million to the Center for American History, which was subsequently renamed the Dolph Briscoe Center for American History and for which he served on the Advisory Council. The Briscoe Center holds the Briscoe Papers, which include his gubernatorial records as well as Briscoe family business records.

In June 2008, Briscoe donated $1.2 million in memory of his late granddaughter, Kate Marmion, to found the Kate Marmion Regional Cancer Medical Center.  The CMC will serve patients of southwest Texas counties (Uvalde, Real, Zavala, Edwards, Medina, Maverick, Val Verde, Dimmit and Kinney) who otherwise would have to drive to San Antonio for radiation therapy.

Death
Briscoe died on the evening of June 27, 2010 at his home in Uvalde, Texas following complications of heart and kidney failure at the age of 87. A public viewing for the former Texas Governor was held at the Rushing-Estes-Knowles Funeral Home chapel on Wednesday, June 30, 2010 and funeral services were held at the Saint Phillip's Episcopal Church, 323 North Getty Street in Uvalde at 10:00 am on Thursday, July 1, 2010 where thousands of mourners including former Governor Mark White, then-Governor Rick Perry, then-Railroad Commissioner Elizabeth Ames Jones, former Houston Mayor Bill White and others attended the service. He was buried at the Briscoe Rio Frio Ranch Cemetery at the family ranch next to his wife.

In 2011, the Garner Museum in Uvalde, part of the Briscoe Center of American History at the University of Texas at Austin, was renamed the Briscoe-Garner Museum, and the second floor converted for commemoration of Briscoe's life and career.

Election history

1972

Bibliography

 Briscoe, Dolph Briscoe: My Life in Texas Ranching and Politics.  2008.

References

External links

 Briscoe Center for American History official website

Democratic Party governors of Texas
Democratic Party members of the Texas House of Representatives
1923 births
2010 deaths
United States Army personnel of World War II
People from Austin, Texas
People from Uvalde, Texas
University of Texas at Austin alumni
United States Army officers
Ranchers from Texas
Deaths from kidney failure
Deaths from pneumonia in Texas
20th-century American Episcopalians
Military personnel from Texas